The New Cyprus Party (Turkish: Yeni Kıbrıs Partisi) is a democratic socialist Turkish-Cypriot political party. Before 2004 it was known as the Patriotic Unity Movement (Yurtsever Birlik Hareketi).

References

External links
Official website
Official web site of Yeniçağ Newspaper

1989 establishments in Northern Cyprus
Cypriot nationalism
Democratic socialist parties in Europe
Ecosocialist parties
Party of the European Left observer parties
Political parties established in 1989
Political parties in Northern Cyprus
Socialist parties in Cyprus